Grant Township is a township in Vermilion County, Illinois, USA.  As of the 2010 census, its population was 6,028 and it contained 2,817 housing units.

History
Grant Township was originally called Lyon Township but it was changed in 1862 to honor Ulysses S. Grant. He had just won a surrender by Confederate forces at Fort Donelson in Tennessee.

Geography

Cities and towns
 Hoopeston
 Rossville (north quarter)

Unincorporated towns
 Cheneyville

Extinct towns
 Coalton
 Heaton

Adjacent townships
 Hickory Grove Township, Benton County, Indiana (northeast)
 Prairie Green Township, Iroquois County (northeast)
 Prairie Township, Warren County, Indiana (east)
 Jordan Township, Warren County, Indiana (southeast)
 Ross Township (south)
 Butler Township (west)
 Fountain Creek Township, Iroquois County (northwest)
 Lovejoy Township, Iroquois County (northwest)

Cemeteries
The township contains one cemetery, Redtop.

Major highways
  Illinois State Route 1
  Illinois State Route 9

Airports and landing strips
 Beckley Airfield
 Hoopeston Community Memorial Hospital Heliport

Demographics

References
 U.S. Board on Geographic Names (GNIS)
 United States Census Bureau cartographic boundary files

External links
 US-Counties.com
 City-Data.com
 Illinois State Archives

Townships in Vermilion County, Illinois
Townships in Illinois
1862 establishments in Illinois